Cornbrook tram stop is a tram stop on Greater Manchester's light rail Metrolink system in the Cornbrook area of Manchester, England. It is an interchange station, allowing passenger transfer between the network's Altrincham, Eccles, Airport, Trafford Park and South Manchester lines. The station opened on 6 December 1999 for line transfers and allowed street-level entry and exit to the public from 3 September 2005. It takes its name from Cornbrook Road, between the A56 and Pomona Docks on the Manchester Ship Canal, and was built on what was a Cheshire Lines Committee route to Manchester Central railway station. The stop is one of the most used on the Metrolink network.

History

The stop is named after the now culverted Corn Brook, a tributary of the River Irwell which runs through the area.

The stop opened with the Eccles extension on 6 December 1999 with two through platforms and a Manchester facing bay platform for terminating trams. Cornbrook was unique when opened as there was no access to/from the street, the stop being used for transfer between Bury-Altrincham line trams and Eccles Line trams. This was due to security issues and a low estimated usage.

Because of a rise in the local population due to new residential developments, particularly on Ellesmere Street, the stop's emergency exit staircase to the street was converted into a full passenger entrance/exit, which opened on 3 September 2005. There are plans to relocate the  entrance as part of the "Cornbrook Hub" redevelopment.

During August 2009, the track layout was extensively remodelled to accommodate the MediaCityUK tram service and as a result the track was removed from the bay platform reducing the number of platforms to 2. However the infrastructure remains and the platform could be reinstated if the need arises.

This is the second station in this locality as Cornbrook railway station was opened to serve Pomona Gardens on the south side of Cornbrook Road on 1 June 1856 by the Manchester, South Junction and Altrincham Railway (MSJAR), which runs parallel to the Metrolink at this point. The first station closed on 31 May 1865.

Services

Service pattern
At peak times (07:15 – 19:30 Monday to Friday, 09:30 – 18:30 Saturday):

10 trams per hour to Altrincham
10 trams per hour to Ashton-under-Lyne
5 trams per hour to Bury
10 trams per hour to East Didsbury
5 trams per hour to Eccles
5 trams per hour to Manchester Airport
5 trams per hour to MediaCityUK
5 trams per hour to Piccadilly
5 trams per hour to Rochdale Town Centre
5 trams per hour to Shaw and Crompton
5 trams per hour to the Trafford Centre
5 trams per hour to Victoria

Offpeak (all other times during operational hours):

5 trams per hour to Altrincham
5 trams per hour to Ashton-under-Lyne
5 trams per hour to East Didsbury
5 trams per hour to Eccles via MediaCityUK
5 trams per hour to Manchester Airport
5 trams per hour to Piccadilly
5 trams per hour to Rochdale Town Centre
5 trams per hour to the Trafford Centre
5 trams per hour to Victoria
5 trams per hour to Etihad Campus

Connecting bus routes
Cornbrook station is served by bus services on nearby Chester Road. Stagecoach Manchester service 255 runs to Partington via Stretford and Urmston. Services run to Manchester, terminating at Piccadilly Gardens.

Gallery

References

Further reading

External links

Cornbrook Stop Information
Cornbrook area map

Tram stops in Manchester
Tram stops on the Eccles to Piccadilly line
Tram stops on the Altrincham to Bury line
Tram stops on the MediaCityUK to Cornbrook line
Tram stops on the East Didsbury to Rochdale line
Tram stops on the Altrincham to Piccadilly line
Transport infrastructure completed in 1999
1999 establishments in England
Railway stations in Great Britain opened in the 20th century